Industrialny City District is one of the seven city districts of Perm. Population:

History
Industrialny City District is the most recently established district of the city. It was established on March 31, 1972, when it was split from Dzerzhinsky City District.

Geography
The city district is situated completely in the left-bank part of Perm and does not touch the Kama River. The Mulyanka River flows through it. A part of the district is occupied by Chernyayevsky Forest.

Largest streets
Kosmonavtov Highway

References

Notes

Sources
 С. А. Торопов. "Пермь: путеводитель." — Пермь: Кн. изд-во, 1986.

City districts of Perm, Russia
1972 establishments in the Soviet Union